Gerhard Roßbach (28 February 1893 – 30 August 1967), also spelled Rossbach, was a German Freikorps leader and organizer of nationalist groups after World War I.  He is generally credited with inventing the brown uniforms of the Nazi Party after supplying surplus tropical khaki shirts to early troops of the Sturmabteilung (SA).

Life and career
Roßbach was born in Kehrberg, Pomerania. During the Baltic fighting of 1919, his  made an extremely long march from Berlin across Eastern Europe to rescue the Iron Division (another Freikorps) from destruction by the Latvian Army. It went on to participate in the Kapp Putsch in 1920, get banned, and then reformed under numerous changing front organizations, each of which in turn was banned. Money came from the Landbund, heavy industry, and arms dealing. In the early 1920s, he was arrested for trying to overthrow the government.

In 1921 Roßbach, together with others from the Roßbach society, took part in a bike ride to East Prussia. In order to be uniformly equipped for this trip the remaining stock of the East African Lettow shirts, last used by the officers of the Schutztruppe, were bought and then distributed them to the cyclists. These shirts were beige-brown, much lighter than the later Hitler shirts and with white mother-of-pearl buttons. Later these shirts were introduced as a community clothing in his society and in 1924 also for the Salzburg Schill Youth. They were then taken over for the German Schilljugend by Edmund Heines and were later distributed, through the "Schill Sportversand", to the SA.

Roßbach helped start the Schilljugend, a youth organization, to get rid of "intellectual elements" in the youth movements and instill children with "nationalistic, socialistic, authoritative, and militaristic" ideas. He took a special interest in developing its membership. Roßbach organised music festivals which combined folk and classical music to instil national pride and construct radical-nationalist community values.

Roßbach also joined the Nazi Party for a time, and was Hitler's representative in Berlin, setting up front organizations when the Nazis were banned in Prussia. He took part in the Beer Hall putsch of 1923, mobilising students, cadets and officer candidates of the Reichswehr. After the failed putsch, he fled to Vienna using a false passport.  There he was arrested in February 1924, but allowed to remain in Austria. He was recruited by Adolf Hitler to help organize the Sturmabteilung (SA). By 1928, he could claim to have killed "a number of Mecklenburg laborers and Spartacist sympathizers". He later fell out with Hitler during the latter's rise to power and was arrested but not killed during the Night of the Long Knives in 1934.

Historian Robert G. L. Waite described Roßbach as a "sadistic murderer of the so-called Fehmgericht and the notorious homosexual who, according to his own testimony, perverted Ernst Röhm".

After World War II Roßbach operated an import-export company near Frankfurt, and wrote his memoirs in 1950. In his last years he played a prominent role in organising the Bayreuth Festivals of Richard Wagner's music.

References
Notes

Bibliography
Applegate, Celia and Potter, Pamela Maxine (eds) (2002) Music and German National Identity. University of Chicago Press.
Dornberg, John (1982) The Putsch That Failed, Hitler's Rehearsal for Power. Weidenfels & Nicholson.
Friedrich, Thomas (2013) Hitler's Berlin: Abused City Spencer, Stewart (trans). Yale University Press. .
Jones, Nigel and Burleigh, Michael (1987, 2004) A Brief History of the Birth of the Nazis, How the Freikorps blazed a trail for Hitler. Constable & Robinson Ltd.
Roßbach, Gerhard (1950) Mein Weg durch die Zeit: Erinnerungen unt Bekenntnisse ("My Way Across The Era: Recollections And Confessions") Vereinigte Weiburger Buchdruckverein, Weiburg an der Lahn.
Snyder, Louis (1998) Encyclopaedia of the Third Reich. Wordsworth Editions Ltd.
Waite, Robert G. L. (1969) Vanguard of Nazism. W. W. Norton and Company.

1893 births
1967 deaths
20th-century Freikorps personnel
German Army personnel of World War I
German nationalists
Nazi Party politicians
German Völkisch Freedom Party politicians
Kapp Putsch participants
LGBT people in the Nazi Party
German LGBT politicians
Nazis who participated in the Beer Hall Putsch
People from Gryfino County
People from the Province of Pomerania
Prussian Army personnel
20th-century LGBT people